Joseph Duveen, 1st Baron Duveen (1869–1939) is a British art dealer.

Duveen may also refer to:

People
 Henry J. Duveen (1854–1919), an art dealer
 Charles Joel Duveen (1871–1940), an antique dealer
 Joseph Joel Duveen (1843–1908), an art dealer

Other
 Boeing Duveen and The Beautiful Soup, a 1960s British psychedelic rock band